Keegan Swenson (born February 16, 1994) is an American mountain bike and cyclo-cross racing cyclist.

Road cycling 
In September 2022 he received a late call-up to represent USA Cycling in 2022 UCI Road World Championships. He finished the road race in 73rd place.

Major results

2012
 1st  Cross-country, National Junior Championships
 2nd  Cross-country, Pan American Junior Championships
 UCI Junior World Cup
2nd Windham
3rd Houffalize
3rd Mont Sainte Anne
2014
 1st  Cross-country, National Under-23 Championships
2015
 2nd Cross-country, National Championships
2016
 2nd Cross-country, National Championships
 2nd Missoula Challenge
2017
 1st Chile Challenge
 1st Missoula XC
2018
 3rd Perskidol Swiss Epic
2019
 1st  Cross-country, National Championships
 2nd  Team relay, UCI World Championships
2020
 1st Belgian Waffle Ride
2021
 National Championships
1st  Cross-country
1st  Short track
 1st Leadville Trail 100 MTB
 1st OZ Trails U.S Pro Cup XCC
 1st OZ Trails U.S Pro Cup XCO
2022
 1st  Cross-country, National Championships
 1st Crusher in the Tushar
 2nd Unbound Gravel 200

References

External links
Official Website

Profile on USA Cycling
Keegan Swenson on MTBCrossCountry.com

People from Park City, Utah
1994 births
Living people
American male cyclists
American mountain bikers
Cross-country mountain bikers
Cyclists from Utah